Bob and Mike Bryan were the defending champions, but lost in the third round to Leoš Friedl and Mikhail Youzhny.

Martin Damm and Leander Paes won the title, defeating Jonas Björkman and Max Mirnyi in the final, 6–7(5–7), 6–4, 6–3.

Seeds

Draw

Finals

Top half

Section 1

Section 2

Bottom half

Section 3

Section 4

External links
2006 US Open – Men's draws and results at the International Tennis Federation

Men's Doubles
US Open (tennis) by year – Men's doubles